Love Goes All The Way is the third studio album by Shannon, released on October 24, 1986 through Atlantic Records label, on which the artist served as executive producer. Some tracks were produced by Patrick Adams and Robbie Buchanan. The record also released three singles: "Love Goes All the Way", "Prove Me Right", and "Dancin'". The second single, "Prove Me Right", was the only song to garner any airplay, peaking at No. 82 on the Billboard Hot R&B chart.

Track listing

Personnel

Musicians
Shannon: Lead vocals (all tracks), Background vocals (3)
Binker: Drums (1, 2)
Dan Huff: Guitar (1, 2)
Robbie Buchanan: Keyboards (1, 2)
Darryl Phinnessee, Siedah Garrett, Edie Lehman: Background vocals (1, 2)
Richard Cummings: Keyboards (3, 6), Background vocal arrangements (3, 6)
Greg Arnold: Drum programming and keyboards (3, 6)
Nate Wingfield: Guitar (3)
Russell Taylor: Bass (3, 6) (lead bass on 6)
Morris Goldberg: Saxophone (6)
Victoria Dewindt: Background vocals (3, 4, 5, 7, 8)
Cindy Mizelle: Background vocals (3)
Jenny Douglas, Branice McKenzie, Sharon Brooks: Background vocals (6)
C.P. Roth: Keyboards (4, 7)
Carl Sturken: Guitar (4, 7)
Evan Rogers: Background vocals (4, 7)
Patrick Adams: Keyboards and programming (5, 8)
Pancho Morales: Congas (8)
Lucy Martin, Rainy Davis: Background vocals (5, 8)

Miscellaneous
Bob Defrin – art direction
Shannon – executive producer 
Dennis King – mastering
Roy Volkman – photography

References

External links
Love Goes All the Way review at Allmusic

1986 albums
Atlantic Records albums
Shannon (singer) albums